Hvar culture, also known as Hvar-Lisičići culture, was a Neolithic culture in the eastern Adriatic coast, named after the Adriatic island of Hvar.

Sources
 Hvarska kultura at enciklopedija.hr 
 Povijest Hvara 

Neolithic cultures of Europe
Archaeological cultures of Southeastern Europe
Archaeological cultures in Croatia
History of Dalmatia